Distanced from Reality is the first split album from New Jersey heavy metal band Solace and Solarized under the generic name "Jersey Devils".
This album's cover art was done by Larsupilami.

Recorded at Trax East Studios, South River, New Jersey and ~Recorded Live, Mixed at Subterranean Sound, Long Branch, New Jersey

Track listing
SOLARIZED "Slide" – 4:06
SOLARIZED "Drifter" – 3:13
SOLARIZED "Crucible" – 4:17
SOLARIZED "Sugar Bag" – 2:44
SOLACE "Heavy Birth/2-Fisted" – 8:29
SOLACE "Dirt" – 8:04
SOLACE "Try" – 6:17
SOLACE "Funk #49 (Live in Tokyo'98)" – 7:45~ (The James Gang cover)

Line up
Jason: Vocals, Lyrics
Rob Hultz: Bass
Tommy Southard: Guitars
Jason Silverino: Drums
Additional Drums by Matt Gunvordahl

References

External links
[ Allmusic Review]
Various reviews hosted by MeteorCity.Com

1999 albums
Solace (band) albums
MeteorCity albums